Paul Beliën (born 1959), is a Flemish Belgian journalist, author and founder of the conservative blog The Brussels Journal.

Beliën is a master of law with specialisations in European and social security law from the University of Ghent and has a PhD in international studies from the University of Buckingham. He is vice president of the International Free Press Society and a senior editor at the Hudson Institute. He has written in a large number of international publications.

He is an advocate of Flemish independence, free trade and is an opponent of abortion, euthanasia and gay marriage. He is a strong Americophile and has been actively opposed to immigration into Europe by Muslims. He is part of the counter-jihad movement. Beliën published a book about the political history of Belgium, and what he sees as parallels in the creation of the European Union in A Throne in Brussels.

Beliën is married to Alexandra Colen, a former member of the Belgian Federal Parliament, and the political party Vlaams Belang. They have homeschooled all of their children.

Career
Beliën has written in several newspapers such as The Wall Street Journal, The Independent, The Washington Times, The American Conservative, The Daily Mail, The Spectator, and in Belgium 't Pallieterke, Gazet van Antwerpen, Trends and De Tijd. He was editor of the conservative magazine Nucleus.

A Throne in Brussels
In 2005 Beliën published A Throne in Brussels: Britain, the Saxe-Coburgs and the Belgianization of Europe. The book explains Belgian history through the life and acts of the country's six kings. Contrary to mainstream historians, Beliën depicts an artificial state, called into existence by the Belgian revolution of 1830, and led by rather ruthless kings and a corrupt political elite ever since. The book touches controversial subjects such as Leopold II's brutal colonisation of the Congo, the relation to Nazi Germany in World War II and the numerous Belgian political scandals in recent decades, including the pedophile Marc Dutroux affair. He suggests that the real father of Queen Victoria's husband Albert, Prince Consort, was King Leopold I of Belgium, Albert's maternal uncle, rather than Ernst I, Duke of Saxe-Coburg and Gotha, as is otherwise believed.

Beliën warns that the European Union, if based on multi-ethnic Belgium as a model, will be an artificial construct without any national consciousness, prone to corruption and elitarian government.

The book uses academic source citations. It was well received by some eurosceptic or conservative commentators, including philosopher Roger Scruton, Lord Rees-Mogg, economist Lord Ralph Harris, historian Hugo Vickers, and British Conservative MEP Daniel Hannan. A review in Economic Affairs said the book "includes some interesting ideas on the similarities between Belgium and the EU, but its arguments appear to contain many simplifications and controversial assertions."

1990 Baudouin abortion question

Beliën was editor at the foreign desk of the Gazet van Antwerpen, until he was fired in April 1990.

Beliën had received information in October 1989, that the Belgian King, Baudouin, would not sign the new abortion law. Although the editor in chief of the Gazet van Antwerpen, Lou de Clerck, found this information to be too sensitive to be published, Beliën published it anyway in the Wall Street Journal on 1 November 1989 and also later in NRC Handelsblad. In reaction to this, De Clerck refused to let Beliën write in foreign newspapers, mentioning his relationship to the Gazet van Antwerpen.

An op-ed of Beliën for the NRC Handelsblad (published 6 April 1990) mentioned that Beliën was working "for a newspaper in Antwerp, whose name he could not mention". A couple of days later Beliën was fired. Jos Huypens, deputy editor of the Gazet, said that the cause of Beliën's firing was a "conflict that was dragging on for years". Shortly later, the Wall Street Journal published another Beliën piece, detailing the connections between political parties and the media in Belgium.

Leo de Haes, a former journalist at Humo, alleged that Beliën was fired in order to rid the Gazet of "Vlaams Blok elements".

Opinions

Guy Verhofstadt and Flemish liberalism
In an article (23 June 2004) for the business newspaper De Tijd Beliën reflected on the policies of Guy Verhofstadt who was then serving as prime-minister of Belgium. According to Beliën, Verhofstadt brought Flemish Liberalism to the brink of the abyss. Beliën stated that he saw in Verhofstadt a transformation from adoring the economic liberalism of Ronald Reagan and Margaret Thatcher, and the laureling of Ludwig Erhard of Verhofstadt in Beliën's magazine Nucleus in 1990, to a Third Way position taken by Tony Blair and Bill Clinton, with Verhofstadt ultimately taking an Old Europe stance with Jacques Chirac and Gerhard Schröder in 2003. According to Beliën, this last 'change of winds' by Verhofstadt prevented him to become the next President of the EU Commission. Furthermore, Beliën thinks that the vacuum left by Verhofstadt's failure to turn the VLD into a broad people's party has been filled by the Vlaams Belang.

Immigrant crime issues and censure controversy

In May 2006, Beliën received a letter from the Centre for Equal Opportunities and Opposition to Racism asking him to remove the post Geef ons Wapens! ("Give us Weapons!") from his blog, The Brussels Journal. That title referred to a 1963 –then obviously figurative– outcry refutedly ascribed to the later Prime Minister Martens that was related to disputes between Belgian speakers of Dutch and of French. The agency claimed Beliën's blog post was a "call for violence against a group because of its ethnic or national origin" and that it violated the Belgian law of 1981 on racism and xenophobia.

The Centre against Racism didn't saw/overlooked the English written article ("Murder Shocks Brussels While PM and Cardinal Blame Victims") from the hand of Paul Beliën, two days earlier. Beliën wrote: "For an entire week the police, the authorities and most of the media have tried to downplay the fact that the killers are Muslim youths. Prime Minister Guy Verhofstadt and Cardinal Godfried Danneels addressed the indignation, but gave it a spin of their own. How was it possible for such an atrocity to take place in a crowd with no-one interfering, they asked. Both Verhofstadt and Danneels said that Joe was a victim of "indifference in Belgian society". "Where were you last Wednesday at 4 pm?!" the Cardinal asked the congration in Brussels Cathedral during his Easter sermon on Sunday. The Cardinal blamed the murder on the materialism and greed of Western society "where people get killed for an MP3 player".

Belgian citizens realize, however, that the murder has nothing to do with "indifference in Belgian society", but everything with a group of North African youths terrorizing Brussels and the "indifference" of the authorities to eradicate this scourge."

The blog post was written in the context of the Joe Van Holsbeeck murder, which was originally thought to have been perpetrated by people of North African descent but later found to be perpetrated by Polish immigrants of Gypsy descent. Paul Beliën denied all allegations of the centre, but did remove the text. A translation of an extract from his text follows:
The predators have teeth and claws. The predators have knives. Starting when they're small, they learn at their yearly offerings how to cut the throats of warm-blooded livestock. We get sick at the sight of blood, but they don't. They're trained and they're armed. We can't even carry pepperspray in our pockets. They have switchblades and butchers knives and they know how to use them.

On 25 April 2006 Beliën wrote a new article, which title differs from the post Geef ons Wapens! ("Give us Weapons!") from his blog, The Brussels Journal  with a new title  "En Geef Ons Dus Wapens" ("And Thus Give Us Weapons").
Beliën made a lot of effort to remove any sign of the article Geef ons Wapens! ("Give us Weapons!").

A month later, Paul Beliën re-iterated his stand from that article, after the death of Guido Demoor in an Antwerp bus, saying:
The Belgian state is no longer able to guarantee the security of its citizens. [...] Belgians do not have a constitutional or legal right to bear arms, not even purely defensive arms such as peppersprays. With the police and the government failing to protect law-abiding citizens the latter are, however, totally unprotected. Saturday's murder has shocked bus drivers and train conductors, but they stress that they are not in the least surprised. Violence on public transport has become a fact of life.
After the conservative Washington Times commented that "free speech is under attack in Belgium", the Flemish newspaper Het Nieuwsblad complained about the Time's links to Reverend Moon.

The Belgian unitary state
Beliën supports the independence of Flanders from Belgium. Beliën believes that the Belgian state has always seen the Flemish "as a threat." He sees both the EU and the Belgian state as a denial of Flemish national sovereignty, and as a danger.

On 26 June 2008, in light of the lasting Belgian political crisis, Paul Beliën wrote on his blog that he expects the unitary Belgian state is about come to an end.

Homeschooling prosecution

In June 2006 a judicial enquiry was conducted regarding the homeschooling of Beliën's children. The Flemish Ministry of Education had asked the judiciary to press charges on child neglect by failing to educate his children adequately.
In 2003, the Flemish government adapted the executive order on compulsory education, requiring homeschooling parents to sign an agreement about the education they give their children. The declaration contains the following statement, inspired by the United Nations Convention on the Rights of the Child:

The undersigned bind(s) themselves to give education that is aimed at the development of the full personality and talents of the child and at the preparation of the child on an active life as an adult, and that promotes the respect for the basic rights of man and for the cultural values of the child itself and of others., Dutch wording of the declaration

If the parents fail to provide an adequate education for their children, as estimated by two state inspectors, the courts may force the child to attend a school.

Paul Beliën and his wife, MP Alexandra Colen, have refused to sign the declaration, arguing that signing such a declaration "undermines the authority of parents and transfers it to the state".

Professor John Kersey, a British educational consultant and libertarian, stated in a pamphlet supporting the Beliën family that the government educational inspectors are held to no objective standards, that "their questioning of children is reported as being random and arbitrary" and that there is no right of appeal against their verdict. He claims the inspectors only have the purpose of removing children from homeschooling and force them into state schools based on the "authoritarian socialist views" of the Belgian powers in force.

Paul Beliën, Alexandra Colen and others have speculated about a possible political agenda of dissident persecution behind what they call the state's "crackdown on homeschoolers". They argue that Beliën was summoned to a police station to give a statement on 13 June 2006, shortly after the above-mentioned incident with the Centre for Equal Opportunities and Opposition to Racism. Kersey claims outright that "Dr Beliën has incurred the wrath of the authorities as a result of expressing opinions that they find inconvenient, and as a result, any cause is being found to make his life difficult."

Islamist Watch
As of December 2006, Beliën was appointed director of Islamist Watch. Islamist Watch is a new project of the think tank Middle East Forum which combats the ideas and institutions of Islamic extremism in the United States and other Western countries. According to the Middle East Forum's website, Beliën received this appointment because of his emergence as "one of Europe's leading experts on lawful Islamism, particularly in his role as founder and editor of The Brussels Journal."

Publications
 Beliën, Paul, Abortus, het grote taboe, Roularta Books, Zellik, 1992
 Beliën, Paul, A throne in Brussels : Britain, the Saxe-Coburgs and the Belgianization of Europe, Imprint Academic, Charlottesville (VA), 2005

References

External links
 The Brussels Journal (English and Dutch)
 Secessie (Dutch)
 Message for the Belgian Government National Review's Stanley Kurtz on the Belgian government's harassment of The Brussels Journal.
 Belgian beef Washington Times op-ed about Paul Belien and free speech in Belgium.
 Intifada in France? A Pajamas Media Profile in Courage: Paul Belien Richard Miniter of Pajamas Media interviews Paul Belien.

1959 births
Living people
Alumni of the University of Buckingham

Belgian anti-abortion activists
20th-century Belgian journalists
Male journalists
Flemish journalists
Belgian non-fiction writers
Belgian Roman Catholics
Flemish writers
Counter-jihad activists
Belgian critics of Islam
Belgian bloggers
21st-century Belgian journalists